All Together Now is an Australian reality television music competition on the Seven Network which was presented by Julia Zemiro and Ronan Keating. It was based on the British show of the same name.

In June 2019, the series was cancelled and would not return for a second season.

Format 
In each episode, a range of singers take to the stage, but waiting to judge each performance is "The 100" – a panel of one hundred music experts and performers from across Australia, headed by former Boyzone lead singer, Ronan Keating.

The 100 comprises a plethora of judges from Music genres ranging from Opera, Musical Theatre to Rap and Alternative, you name it, it is in most cases covered in some way by some-one of "The 100".

The Judges also come from a Diversity of backgrounds, some with a lifetime of some 40–50 years in the professional Musical Industry to others with only a few years who have had success early in life.

Obviously not all agree with each other's opinion and this is what makes this show interesting, and the Goal of the Contestant is to Attempt to get all 100 Judges on their Feet and Buzz to take them to the Grand Final of the Series.

The heats 
During each heat, performers try and outscore their competitors in order to earn a seat on the top two podium. Whenever a performer scores high enough for a podium place, the act in 2nd place is eliminated as a result.

From each heat, one acts go through to the series finale. Once all acts have sung, the acts in 1st and 2nd sing-off against one another and the winner of that sing off earns qualifying for the final spot.

Prior to filming, all performers choose the song they want to sing. The 100 learn the words to all the songs before the show, but they do not know who is going to come out and sing said songs to them. Each song is approximately 90 seconds long, but importantly the 100 can only join in for the final 60 seconds as signified by a lighting change. This means that the 100 have the same amount of time to join in the singing for every act.

Tie-breaks 
In the event of a tied score, the 100 reviews the full performances of both acts on monitors in the studio. Each member of the 100 decides which act they prefer and votes by pressing their button. The act with the most votes takes their seat on the podium, meaning that the act with the fewer votes either drops down a podium place or exits the competition. In the event that the tiebreak vote is also tied, Ronan Keating, as captain of the 100 has the casting vote.

The tie-break was used just once in the entire competition, in the grand final, when Lai, who eventually won the competition, was tied with Emma, both with 90 points, as equal 3rd of the 3 who would perform in the sing-off. Lai won the tie-break, went to the sing-off, and ultimately won the competition.

The sing-off 
For the sing-off at the end of the show, scores are reset to zero and the 1st and 2nd placed acts perform a new song chosen from a given shortlist. In the event that both acts wish to sing the same song from that shortlist, the performer in 1st place has priority.

In the grand final, there were three positions in the sing-off. Lai, who won the competition, was third in the grand final prior to the sing-off.

The wildcard 

A wildcard was chosen by the judges, who could pick just one contestant out of those who failed to win their weekly heat, who participated in the grand final, along with the seven weekly winners.

The wildcard was Teagan

The final and the prize 
In the final, the winners of each heat, along with one wild card - an act who failed to qualify via their heat but was voted for by The 100 to qualify for the finale - perform again in front of The 100 with a new song. As with the heats, the top two acts sing again and the act with the highest score after this final sing-off wins the series and with it the $100,000 cash prize.

In the final, the first round was won by Melbourne-based Tarryn Stokes, the only contestant to score a perfect 100 in the final round. Royston Sagigi-Baira, an Indigenous singer from Old Mapoon, was given a score of 91 in spite of messing-up the timing half-way through the song, with the 100 singing for him to help him over the line, and he ended with the second most points. Both Fijian-born Brisbane-based Lai Utovou and Emma Mylott of Sydney scored 90, with Lai the last to perform. With three positions available in the sing-off, the 100 were asked to choose who they preferred out of Lai and Emma in the only tie-breaker of the competition, with Lai ultimately adjudged the winner of the two, and Emma was eliminated. Opera singer Jessica Boyd was also close to making the sing-off with a score of 88. None of the other participants had similar scores, with the next highest being wildcard Teagan, who scored 78.

In the sing-off, Lai went first and scored 87 points, then Royston scored 54 and was eliminated. Tarryn, going last, scored 78 points, meaning that Lai, who was equal 3rd initially, won the competition and $100,000 prize.

Summary
To date, one season has been broadcast, as summarised below. In June 2019, Seven Network decided to cancel the show after failing to find suitable air dates for a second season.

The 100
The 100 are a range of music experts and performers from across Australia. They are cast to include a diverse mix of ages, backgrounds and a variety of music genres. Captain of The 100 is pop star Ronan Keating. Ronan's vote carries no extra weight. The only time his vote takes precedence is in the case of a tied vote in the Tie Break. 

 Alex Reid - music talent manager
 Amanda Harrison – musical theatre star
 Amy Longhurst 
 Andrew De Silva – lead singer for Boom Crash Opera & CDB, Australia's Got Talent winner 2012
 Anton Koritini
 Brendan De La Hay – cabaret performer
 Carl De Villa – original and tribute singer and artist
 Carla Troiano
 Chris Tamway - Indigenous guitarist and 2016 Australia's Got Talent contestant
 Christopher Booth - tenor voice and trumpeter/multi-mnstrumentalist (opera, jazz, rock, pop, Latin)
 Clarissa Spata
 Connor Vidas - country singer
 Dan Murphy – Sydney DJ
 Daniel Spillane
 Dean Ray – rock singer
 Diana Torossian 
 Diane Regan
 DJ Jazzy
 Donna Jordee
 Dylan Wright - singer/songwriter
 Elisa James
 Ellen Reed – The Voice grand finalist
 Emily Rex
 Eva Spata
 Gemma Lyon
 German Silva
 Glenn Whitehall
 Gospo Collective's Ben Gillard & Charmaine Jones – gospel choir directors
 Greg Gould – powerhouse vocalist, Australia's Got Talent finalist  
 Hugh Barrington
 Hugh Wilson
 Inkasounds - James & Robyn
 Jacqueline Dark – opera singer
 Jason Baclig & Lachlan Hay
 Jason Jackson – Michael Jackson impersonator
 Jay Boyle
 Jay Parrino – rock singer, virtuoso guitarist, Australia's Got Talent finalist
 Jeremy Brennan – pianoman
 Jess & Matt – popstar couple
 Jessica Matthews
 Jhay
 John Longmuir – opera singer
 Jordan Raskopoulos – musical comedian and LGBTQI advocate 
 Josie Palermo
 Kattimoni – soul singer
 Kayo Marbilus – ARIA charts recording artist, songwriter, actor
 Kellie Crawford (née Hoggart) – singer and actress, award-winning entertainer (former member of Teen Queens and original member of Hi-5)
 Komiti Levai - soul singer/songwriter 
 Kristy James - singer/songwriter
 Lara Mulcahy – comedy actress, vocal coach and singer
 Liam Burrows
 Liam O'Byrne 
 Lisa Viola
 Lolo Lovina
 Luke Zanchanaro & Tannah de Gersigny 
 Lucy Holmes – breakfast radio host/Kylie Minogue impersonator
 Maria Mercedes – industry legend
 Mark Gable – The Choirboys frontman
 Mary Kiani - former Scottish Queen of Pop and powerhouse vocalist
 May Johnston – funk and soul diva
 Melanie Lewin
Michael Cormick
 Michael Dalton – cabaret performer
 Mike Scott
 Mini Marilyn – cabaret character (performed by Elizabeth Evans)
 Minnie Cooper – iconic Sydney drag queen
 Missy Lancaster – country singer-songwriter
 Mitch Tambo
 Monique Montez
 Mys T - performing artist/vocal coach
 Natasha Pinto
 Nikki Bennett
 Paula Baxter - soul singer
 Phil Golotta 
 Pia Anderson 
 Rada Tochalna 
 Ray Isaac
 Rhonda Burchmore – singer and entertainer 
 Rhys Tolhurst – singer/songwriter
 Richard Joyce
 Richard Valdez
 Rocco Bene - singer/songwriter
 Rose Farrell
 Rufus Barr - Sydney Karaoke Host
 Rupert Noffs - NIDA-trained "triple threat" 
 Ryan Smith
 Saba Saliba
 Samantha Leith
 Samuel Gaskin - singer/songwriter/entertainer/managing director @BEATENTERTAINMENT
 Sarah Capodicasa
 Scot Finnie
Shauna Jensen – Australian singer
 Sharon Calabro - Australian singer and musical performer
 Siki Daha
 Silvie Paladino – musical theatre performer
 Sisters Doll – glam rock trio
 Sophie Carter
 Steve Wood
 Take Two – rapping twins
 Tarisai Vushe – Australian Idol 2007 Top 5 and The Lion King singer
 Vanessa Powell
 Victoria McGee
 Wil Sabin – creative director, choreographer, and entertainment consultant

References 

Seven Network original programming
2018 Australian television series debuts
2018 Australian television series endings
Television series by Endemol Australia
English-language television shows
Singing talent shows
All Together Now (franchise)
Australian television series based on British television series